Scarlett Hannah Hefner (née Byrne; born 6 October 1990) is an English actress. She is best known for her roles as Slytherin student Pansy Parkinson in the Harry Potter series, and as Nora Hildegard in The Vampire Diaries.

Career
Byrne began her acting career in 2005 in the short film CryBaby, before portraying Chloe Daniels in an episode of the British TV drama Doctors.

In 2009, Byrne got the role of Pansy Parkinson in the sixth film in the Harry Potter series, Harry Potter and the Half-Blood Prince, before reprising her role in the final two films of the series. Following the end of the Harry Potter series, she played Brittany in Lake Placid: The Final Chapter, as well as appearing in several short videos written by fellow Harry Potter actor Jessie Cave for her website Pindippy.

During 2013, Byrne played the role of Sarah in the short film Lashes. Byrne became a regular cast member for the fourth season of the sci-fi show Falling Skies. She moved to Vancouver for the filming of Falling Skies. While she departs the series at the end of season 4, Byrne reprises the role in the penultimate episode of the series, "Reunion".

In 2015, she joined The Vampire Diaries as witch-vampire hybrid, heretic, Nora Hildegard. Byrne was a major recurring character in the seventh season of the series and appeared in twelve episodes of the season. The character was then killed off in the sixteenth episode along with her fiancé Mary-Louise. She also had a guest appearance role in an episode of the MTV comedy series, Mary + Jane.

In 2017, Byrne played the role of Lisa in the action-thriller film Skybound, alongside Gavin Stenhouse. In February 2017, Byrne posed nude for Playboy magazine.

In October 2018, she joined Evanna Lynch and her partner Keo Motsepe on the trios dance in week 4 on Dancing with the Stars.

In 2019, Byrne portrayed Bronwyn, a witch in Morgan le Fey’s coven in Marvel’s Runaways.

Personal life
In August 2015, Byrne became engaged to Cooper Hefner. On 4 November 2019, Byrne and Hefner announced that they had married. On 24 August 2020, Byrne gave birth to their first daughter. On 26 March 2022, she gave birth to twin daughters.

Filmography

Film

Television

Other work

References

External links
 

1990 births
21st-century English actresses
Actresses from London
English child actresses
English film actresses
English television actresses
Living people
People from Hammersmith
English female models
Hefner family